Goryushkin is a rural locality (a khutor) in Nikolskoye 1-ye Rural Settlement, Vorobyovsky District, Voronezh Oblast, Russia. The population was 64 as of 2010.

Geography 
Goryushkin is located 17 km southeast of Vorobyovka (the district's administrative centre) by road. Nikolskoye 1-ye is the nearest rural locality.

References 

Rural localities in Vorobyovsky District